François Guay (born June 8, 1968) is a Canadian former professional ice hockey centre.

Guay was born in Gatineau, Quebec. As a youth, he played in the 1980 Quebec International Pee-Wee Hockey Tournament with a minor ice hockey team from Brossard.

He was drafted in the eighth round, 152nd overall, by the Buffalo Sabres in the 1986 NHL Entry Draft. He played just one game in the National Hockey League with the Sabres, appearing in a single contest during the 1989–90 season. He did not score a point.

Career statistics

See also
List of players who played only one game in the NHL

References

External links

1968 births
Living people
Adler Mannheim players
Buffalo Sabres draft picks
Buffalo Sabres players
French Quebecers
HC TWK Innsbruck players
Kassel Huskies players
EC KAC players
Laval Titan players
Laval Voisins players
Rochester Americans players
SC Herisau players
Ice hockey people from Gatineau
Canadian expatriate ice hockey players in Austria
Canadian expatriate ice hockey players in Germany
Canadian ice hockey centres